Kiss Kiss (Bang Bang) is a 2001 British comedy film written and directed by Stewart Sugg. It features Stellan Skarsgård, Chris Penn, and Paul Bettany.

Plot 

Felix is a hit-man who wants out of the business. He takes up a job to look after a reclusive man named Bubba who is like a giant kid, he does not understand people and does not know much, never having seen the outside world before. But Felix has bigger problems. He wants to patch up his relationship with his ex-girlfriend, and he's being targeted by his old colleagues who are not letting him get away from his past so easily.

Cast
Stellan Skarsgård  as Felix
Chris Penn  as Bubba
Paul Bettany  as Jimmy
Allan Corduner  as Big Bob
Jacqueline McKenzie  as Sherry
Martine McCutcheon  as Mia
Sienna Guillory  as Kat
Stephen Walters as Kick Box Stevie
Ashley Artus  as Mick Foot
Belinda Stewart-Wilson as Camilla
Benedict Wong as Pat Proudence

References

External links 
 
 
 

2001 comedy films
2001 films
British comedy films
Films shot in London
Films shot in Hertfordshire
Films shot in East Sussex
Films scored by John Dankworth
2000s English-language films
2000s British films